This is a list of shootings in Sweden, ordered chronologically. Seventeen people were killed by firearms in Sweden in 2011, but by 2017, more than 300 shootings had resulted in 41 deaths and more than 100 people injured. 

 4 March 1961: Kungälv school shooting. Sweden's most recent school shooting. 1 dead, 6 injured.
 9 January 1967: Handen murders. The victims were two police officers and a night guard.
 28 February 1986: Assassination of Olof Palme. The victim was the Prime Minister of Sweden, aged 59.
 11 June 1994: Mattias Flink murdered five women, a bicyclist and a security guard.
 4 December 1994: Tommy Zethraeus killed three women and a bouncer. They were all shot at the entrance to a restaurant.
 22 or 23 July 1997: Keillers Park murder. The victim was Josef ben Meddour, aged 36.
 28 May 1999: Malexander murders: Swedish policemen Olov Borén and Robert Karlström were killed by bank robbers.
 10 January 2004: Knutby murder: Alexandra Fossmo was killed. Her employer, 30-year-old IT entrepreneur Daniel Linde, was shot in the head and chest, but survived.
 Between December 2009 and October 2010: 2009–10 Malmö shootings. An anti-immigration shooter targeted immigrants.
 18 March 2015: The 2015 Gothenburg pub shooting was a gang-related shooting in which a 25-year-old said to be a leading figure in a local gang and a 20-year-old bystander were killed.

References 

Shooting
Shootings in Sweden
Lists of shootings by location